Granach is a German surname. Notable people with the surname include:

Alexander Granach (1893–1945), German-Austrian actor
Gad Granach (1915–2011), German actor, son of Alexander

See also
Cranach

German-language surnames